Forlanini is a district ("quartiere") of Milan, Italy. It is part of the Zone 4 administrative division, located east of the city centre. 

The northern boundary of the district is eponymous Viale Enrico Forlanini, which is the main avenue connecting Milan to the Linate Airport. The other boundaries of the Forlanini district are the Milan belt railway and the Tangenziale Est ring road.

Forlanini is a residential district, with 1960s apartment blocks being the most common type of buildings. Via Mecenate, leading south towards Ponte Lambro, is one of the largest and most important streets in the district.

Districts of Milan